Rodrigo Sánchez (born 19 September 1991) is a Peruvian tennis player.

Sánchez has a career high ATP singles ranking of 633 achieved on 18 August 2014. He also has a career high ATP doubles ranking of 428 achieved on 13 October 2014.

Sánchez represents Peru at the Davis Cup, where he has a W/L record of 0–1.

References

External links

1991 births
Living people
Peruvian male tennis players
Sportspeople from Lima
20th-century Peruvian people
21st-century Peruvian people